The 1988 Women's Pan American Junior Championship was the first edition of the Women's Pan American Junior Championship. It was held between 10 and 17 August 1988 in Buenos Aires, Argentina.

Results

Final

Final standings

External links
Official website

Women's Pan-Am Junior Championship
Pan American Junior Championship
Pan American Junior Championship
International women's field hockey competitions hosted by Argentina
hockey
Pan American Junior Championship
1980s in Buenos Aires
 Sports competitions in Buenos Aires